Social liberalism, also known as new liberalism in the United Kingdom, modern liberalism in the United States where it is known as liberalism, left-liberalism in Germany, and progressive liberalism in Spanish-speaking countries, is a political philosophy and variety of liberalism that endorses social justice and the expansion of civil and political rights. It is economically based on the social market economy and views the common good as harmonious with the individual's freedom. Social liberals overlap with social democrats in accepting economic intervention more than other liberals; its importance is considered auxiliary compared to social democrats. Ideologies that emphasize its economic policy include welfare liberalism, New Deal liberalism in the United States, and Keynesian liberalism. Cultural liberalism is an ideology that highlights its cultural aspects. The world has widely adopted social liberal policies.

Social liberal ideas and parties tend to be considered centre to centre-left, although there are deviations from these positions to both the political left or right. Addressing economic and social issues, such as poverty, welfare, infrastructure, health care, education, and the climate using government intervention, while emphasising individual rights and autonomy are expectations under a social liberal government. In modern political discourse, social liberalism is associated with progressivism, a left-liberalism contrasted to the right-leaning neoliberalism, and combines support for a mixed economy with cultural liberalism. Social liberalism may also refer to American progressive stances on sociocultural issues, such as reproductive rights and same-sex marriage, in contrast with American social conservatism. Cultural liberalism is often referred to as social liberalism because it expresses the social dimension of liberalism; however, it is not the same as the broader political ideology known as social liberalism. In American politics, a social liberal may hold either conservative (economic liberal) or liberal (economic progressive) views on fiscal policy.

Origins

United Kingdom 

By the end of the 19th century, downturns in economic growth challenged the principles of classical liberalism, a growing awareness of poverty and unemployment present within modern industrial cities, and the agitation of organised labour. A significant political reaction against the changes introduced by industrialisation and laissez-faire capitalism came from one-nation conservatives concerned about social balance and the introduction of the famous Education Act 1870. However, socialism later became a more important force for change and reform. Some Victorian writers—including Charles Dickens, Thomas Carlyle, and Matthew Arnold—became early influential critics of social injustice.

John Stuart Mill contributed enormously to liberal thought by combining elements of classical liberalism with what eventually became known as the new liberalism. Mill developed this philosophy by liberalising the concept of consequentialism to promote a rights based system. He also developed his liberal dogma by combining the idea of using a utilitarian foundation to base upon the idea of individual rights. The new liberals tried to adapt the old language of liberalism to confront these difficult circumstances, which they believed could only be resolved through a broader and more interventionist conception of the state. Ensuring that individuals did not physically interfere with each other or merely by impartially having formulated and applied laws could not establish an equal right to liberty. More positive and proactive measures were required to ensure that every individual would have an equal opportunity for success.

New Liberals 

In the late 19th and early 20th centuries, a group of British thinkers known as the New Liberals made a case against laissez-faire classical liberalism. It argued in favour of state intervention in social, economic, and cultural life. What they proposed is now called social liberalism. The New Liberals, including intellectuals like Thomas Hill Green, Leonard Hobhouse, and John A. Hobson, saw individual liberty achievable only under favourable social and economic circumstances. In their view, the poverty, squalor, and ignorance in which many people lived made it impossible for freedom and individuality to flourish. New Liberals believed through collective action coordinated by a strong, welfare-oriented, and interventionist state could alleviate these conditions.

The Liberal governments of Henry Campbell-Bannerman and H. H. Asquith, mainly thanks to Chancellor of the Exchequer and later Prime Minister David Lloyd George, established the foundations of the welfare state in the United Kingdom before World War I. The comprehensive welfare state built in the United Kingdom after World War II, although primarily accomplished by the Labour Party's Attlee ministry, was significantly designed by two Liberals, namely John Maynard Keynes (who laid the foundations in economics with the Keynesian Revolution) and William Beveridge (whose Beveridge Report was used to design the welfare system).

Historian Peter Weiler has argued: Although still partially informed by older Liberal concerns for character, self-reliance, and the capitalist market, this legislation nevertheless marked a significant shift in Liberal approaches to the state and social reform, approaches that later governments would slowly expand and that would grow into the welfare state after the Second World War. What was new in these reforms was the underlying assumption that the state could be a positive force, that the measure of individual freedom ... was not how much the state left people alone, but whether he gave them the capacity to fill themselves as individuals.Weiler, Peter (2016). The New Liberalism: Liberal Social Theory in Great Britain, 1889-1914 (2016). Excerpt .

Germany 
In 1860s Germany, left-liberal politicians like Max Hirsch, Franz Duncker, and Hermann Schulze-Delitzsch established trade unions—modelled on their British counterparts—to help workers improve working and economic conditions through reconciliation of interests and cooperation with their employers rather than class struggle. Schulze-Delitzsch is also the founding father of the German cooperative movement and the organiser of the world's first credit unions. Some liberal economists, such as Lujo Brentano or Gerhart von Schulze-Gävernitz, established the Verein für Socialpolitik (German Economic Association) in 1873 to promote social reform based on the historical school of economics and therefore rejecting classical economics, proposing a third way between Manchester Liberalism and socialist revolution in the 1871-founded German Empire.

However, the German left-liberal movement fragmented into wings and new parties over the 19th century. The main objectives of the left-liberal parties—the German Progress Party and its successors—were free speech, freedom of assembly, representative government, secret and equal but obligation-tied suffrage, and protection of private property. At the same time, they were strongly opposed to creating a welfare state, which they called state socialism. The main differences between the left-liberal parties were:

 The national ambitions.
 The different substate people's goals.
 Free trade against Schutzzollpolitik.
 The building of the national economy.

The term 'social liberalism' was used first in 1891 by Austria-Hungarian economist and journalist Theodor Hertzka. Subsequently, in 1893, the historian and social reformer Ignaz Jastrow also used this term and joined the German Economic Association. He published the socialist democratic manifesto "Social-liberal: Tasks for Liberalism in Prussia" to create an "action group" for the general people's welfare in the Social Democratic Party of Germany, which they rejected.

The National-Social Association, founded by the Protestant pastor Friedrich Naumann also maintained contacts with the left liberals. He tried to draw workers away from Marxism by proposing a mix of nationalism and Protestant-Christian-value-inflected social liberalism to overcome class antagonisms by non-revolutionary means. Naumann called this a "proletarian-bourgeois integral liberalism". Although the party could not win any seats and soon dissolved, he remained influential in theoretical German left-liberalism.

In the Weimar Republic, the German Democratic Party was founded and came into an inheritance of the left-liberal past and had a leftist social wing and a rightist economic wing but heavily favoured the democratic constitution over a monarchist one. Its ideas of a socially balanced economy with solidarity, duty, and rights among all workers struggled due to the economic sanctions of the Treaty of Versailles, but it influenced local cooperative enterprises.

After 1945, the Free Democrats included most of the social liberals while others joined the Christian Democratic Union of Germany. Until the 1960s, post-war ordoliberalism was the model for Germany. It had a theoretical social liberal influence based on duty and rights. As the Free Democrats discarded social liberal ideas in a more conservative and economically liberal approach in 1982, some members left the party and formed the social liberal Liberal Democrats.

France 
In France, solidaristic thinkers, including Alfred Fouillée and Émile Durkheim, developed the social-liberal theory in the Third Republic. Sociology inspired them, and they influenced radical politicians like Léon Bourgeois. They explained that a more extensive division of labour caused more opportunity and individualism and inspired more complex interdependence. They argued that the individual had a debt to society, promoting progressive taxation to support public works and welfare schemes. However, they wanted the state to coordinate rather than manage, encouraging cooperative insurance schemes among individuals. Their main objective was to remove barriers to social mobility rather than create a welfare state.

United States 

Social liberalism was a term in the United States to differentiate it from classical liberalism or laissez-faire. It dominated political and economic thought for several years until the word branched off from it around the Great Depression and the New Deal. In the 1870s and the 1880s, the American economists Richard Ely, John Bates Clark, and Henry Carter Adams—influenced both by socialism and the Evangelical Protestant movement—castigated the conditions caused by industrial factories and expressed sympathy toward labour unions. However, none developed a systematic political philosophy, and they later abandoned their flirtations with socialist thinking. In 1883, Lester Frank Ward published the two-volume Dynamic Sociology. He formalized the basic tenets of social liberalism while at the same time attacking the laissez-faire policies advocated by Herbert Spencer and William Graham Sumner. The historian Henry Steele Commager ranked Ward alongside William James, John Dewey, and Oliver Wendell Holmes Jr. and called him the father of the modern welfare state. A writer from 1884 until the 1930s, John Dewey—an educator influenced by Hobhouse, Green, and Ward—advocated socialist methods to achieve liberal goals. John Dewey's expanding popularity as an economist also coincided with the greater Georgist movement that rose in the 1910s, pinnacling with the presidency of Woodrow Wilson. America later incorporated some social liberal ideas into the New Deal, which developed as a response to the Great Depression when Franklin D. Roosevelt came into office.

Implementation 

The welfare state grew gradually and unevenly from the late 19th century but fully developed following World War II, along with the mixed market economy and general welfare capitalism.  Also called embedded liberalism, social liberal policies gained broad support across the political spectrum because they reduced society's disruptive and polarizing tendencies without challenging the capitalist economic system. Businesses accepted social liberalism in the face of widespread dissatisfaction with the boom and bust cycle of the earlier financial system as it seemed to them to be a lesser evil than more left-wing modes of government. Characteristics of social liberalism were cooperation between big business, government, and labour unions. Governments could assume a vital role because the wartime economy had strengthened their power, but the extent to which this occurred varied considerably among Western democracies. Social liberalism is also a generally internationalist ideology. Social liberalism has also historically been an advocate for liberal feminism among other forms social progress.

Social liberals tend to find a compromise between the perceived extremes of unrestrained capitalism and state socialism to create an economy built on regulated capitalism. Due to a reliance on what they believe to be a too centralized government to achieve its goals, critics have called this strain of liberalism a more authoritarian ideological position compared to the original schools of liberal thought, especially in the United States, where conservatives have called presidents Franklin D. Roosevelt and Lyndon B. Johnson authoritarians.

United Kingdom 

The first notable implementation of social liberal policies occurred under the Liberal Party in Britain from 1906 until 1914. These initiatives became known as the Liberal welfare reforms. The main elements included pensions for poor older adults, health, sickness, and unemployment insurance. These changes were accompanied by progressive taxation, particularly in the People's Budget of 1909. The old system of charity relying on the Poor Laws and supplemented by private charity, public cooperatives, and private insurance companies was in crisis, giving the state added impetus for reform. The Liberal Party caucus elected in 1906 also contained more professionals, including academics and journalists, sympathetic to social liberalism. The large business owners had mostly deserted the Liberals for the Conservatives, the latter becoming the favourite party for commercial interests. Both business interests and trade unions regularly opposed the reforms. Liberals most identified with these reforms were Prime Minister H. H. Asquith, John Maynard Keynes, David Lloyd George (especially as Chancellor of the Exchequer), and Winston Churchill (as President of the Board of Trade), in addition to the civil servant (and later Liberal MP) William Beveridge.

Most of the social democratic parties in Europe (notably the British Labour Party) have taken on strong influences of social liberal ideology. Despite Britain's two major parties coming from the traditions of socialism and conservatism, the most substantive political and economic debates of recent times were between social liberal and classical liberal concepts.

Germany 

Alexander Rüstow, a German economist, first proposed the German variant of economically social liberalism. In 1932, he dubbed this kind of social liberalism neoliberalism while speaking at the Social Policy Association. However, that term now carries a meaning different from the one proposed by Rüstow. Rüstow wanted an alternative to socialism and the classical liberal economics developed in the German Empire. In 1938, Rüstow met with various economic thinkers—including Ludwig Mises, Friedrich Hayek, and Wilhelm Röpke—to determine how and what could renew liberalism. Rüstow advocated a powerful state to enforce free markets and state intervention to correct market failures. However, Mises argued that monopolies and cartels operated because of state intervention and protectionism and claimed that the only legitimate role for the state was to abolish barriers to market entry. He viewed Rüstow's proposals as negating market freedom and saw them as similar to socialism.

Following World War II, the West German government adopted Rüstow's neoliberalism, now usually called ordoliberalism or the social market economy, under Ludwig Erhard. He was the Minister of Economics and later became Chancellor. Erhard lifted price controls and introduced free markets. While Germany's post-war economic recovery was due to these policies, the welfare state—which Bismarck had established—became increasingly costly.

Turkey 

The Kemalist economic model was designed by Mustafa Kemal Atatürk in 1930s, founder of the Republic of Turkey, after an unsuccessful attempt to embrace a regulated market economy from İzmir Economic Congress until the 1929 Depression. He put the principle of "etatism" in his Six Arrows and stated that etatism was a unique economic system for Turkey and that it was different from socialism, communism, and collectivism. Atatürk explained his economic idea as follows:

State can't take the place of individuals, but, it must take into consideration the individuals to make them improve and develop theirselves. Etatism includes the work that individuals won't do because they can't make profit or the work which are necessary for national interests. Just as it is the duty of the state to protect the freedom and independence of the country and to regulate internal affairs, the state must take care of the education and health of its citizens. The state must take care of the roads, railways, telegraphs, telephones, animals of the country, all kinds of vehicles and the general wealth of the nation to protect the peace and security of the country. During the administration and protection of the country, the things we just counted are more important than cannons, rifles and all kinds of weapons. (...) Private interests are generally the opposite of the general interests. Also, private interests are based on rivalries. But, you can't create a stable economy only with this. People who think like that are delusional and they will be a failure. (...) And, work of an individual must stay as the main basis of economic growth. Not preventing an individual's work and not obstructing the individual's freedom and enterprise with the state's own activities is the main basis of the principle of democracy.

Moreover, Atatürk said this in his opening speech on 1 November 1937: "Unless there is an absolute necessity, the markets can't be intervened; also, no markets can be completely free." Also it was said by İsmet İnönü that Atatürk's principle of etatism was Keynesian and a Turkish variant of New Deal.

Rest of Europe 
The post-war governments of other countries in Western Europe also followed social liberal policies. These policies were implemented primarily by Christian democrats and social democrats as liberal parties in Europe declined in strength from their peak in the 19th century.

United States 

American political discourse resisted this social turn in European liberalism. While the economic policies of the New Deal appeared Keynesian, there was no revision of liberal theory in favour of more significant state initiatives. Even though the United States lacked an effective socialist movement, New Deal policies often appeared radical and were attacked by the right. American liberalism would eventually evolve into a more anti-communist ideology as a result. American exceptionalism was likely the reason for the separate development of modern liberalism in the United States, which kept mainstream American ideology within a narrow range.

John Rawls' principal work, A Theory of Justice (1971), can be considered a flagship exposition of social liberal thinking, noted for its use of analytic philosophy and advocating the combination of individual freedom and a fairer distribution of resources. According to Rawls, every individual should be allowed to choose and pursue their conception of what is desirable. At the same time, the greater society must maintain a socially just distribution of goods. Rawls argued that differences in material wealth are tolerable if general economic growth and wealth also benefit the poorest. A Theory of Justice countered utilitarian thinking in the tradition of Jeremy Bentham, instead following the Kantian concept of a social contract, picturing society as a mutual agreement between rational citizens, producing rights and duties as well as establishing and defining roles and tasks of the state. Rawls put the equal liberty principle in the first place, providing every person with equal access to the same set of fundamental liberties, followed by the fair equality of opportunity and difference, thus allowing social and economic inequalities under the precondition that privileged positions are accessible to everyone, that everyone has equal opportunities and that even the least advantaged members of society benefit from this framework. This framework repeated itself in the equation of Justice as Fairness. Rawls proposed these principles not just to adherents of liberalism but as a basis for all democratic politics, regardless of ideology. The work advanced social liberal ideas immensely within the 1970s political and philosophic academia. Rawls may therefore be a "patron saint" of social liberalism.

Decline 
Following economic problems in the 1960s and 1970s, liberal thought underwent some transformation. Keynesian financial management faced criticism for interfering with the free market. At the same time, increased welfare spending funded by higher taxes prompted fears of lower investment, lower consumer spending, and the creation of a "dependency culture." Trade unions often caused high wages and industrial disruption, while total employment was considered unsustainable. Writers such as Milton Friedman and Samuel Brittan, whom Friedrich Hayek influenced, advocated a reversal of social liberalism. Their policies—often called neoliberalism—had a significant influence on Western politics, most notably on the governments of United Kingdom Prime Minister Margaret Thatcher and the United States President Ronald Reagan. They pursued policies of deregulation of the economy and reduction in spending on social services.

Part of the reason for the collapse of the social liberal coalition was a challenge in the 1960s and 1970s from financial interests that could operate independently of national governments. A related reason was the comparison of ideas such as socialized medicine, advocated by politicians such as Franklin D. Roosevelt, facing criticisms and being dubbed as socialist by conservatives during the midst of the Red Scare, notably by the previously mentioned Reagan. Another cause was the decline of organized labour which had formed part of the coalition but was also a support for left-wing ideologies challenging the liberal consensus. Related to this were the downfall of working-class consciousness and the growth of the middle class. The push by the United States, which had been least accepting of social liberalism for trade liberalization, further eroded support.

Contemporary revival of social liberal thought 
From the end of the 20th century, at the same time that it was losing political influence, social liberalism experienced an intellectual revival with several substantial authors, including John Rawls (political philosophy), Amartya Sen (philosophy and economy), Ronald Dworkin (philosophy of law), Martha Nussbaum (philosophy), Bruce Ackerman (constitutional law), and others.

Parties and organisations 
In Europe, social liberal parties tend to be small or medium-sized centrist and centre-left parties. Examples of successful European social liberal parties participating in government coalitions at national or regional levels include the Liberal Democrats in the United Kingdom, the Democrats 66 in the Netherlands, and the Danish Social Liberal Party. In continental European politics, social liberal parties are integrated into the Renew Europe group in the European Parliament, the third biggest group in the parliament, and includes social liberal parties, market liberal parties, and centrist parties. Other groups such as the European People's Party, the Greens–European Free Alliance, and the Progressive Alliance of Socialists and Democrats also house some political parties with social-liberal factions.

In North America, social liberalism (as Europe would refer to it) tends to be the dominant form of liberalism present, so in common parlance, "liberal" refers to social liberals. In Canada, social liberalism is held by the Liberal Party of Canada, while in the United States, social liberalism is a significant force within the Democratic Party.

Giving an exhaustive list of social liberal parties worldwide is difficult, mainly because political organisations are not always ideologically pure, and party ideologies often change over time. However, peers such as the Africa Liberal Network, the Alliance of Liberals and Democrats for Europe Party, the Council of Asian Liberals and Democrats, the European Liberal Forum, the Liberal International, and the Liberal Network for Latin America or scholars usually accept them as parties who are following social liberalism as a core ideology.

Social liberal parties or parties with social liberal factions
Social liberal political parties that are more left-biased than general centre-left parties are not described here. (See list of progressive parties)

 Åland: Liberals for Åland
 Argentina: Radical Civic Union
 Australia: Liberal Party of Australia (factions), Australian Labor Party (factions)
 Bahamas: Progressive Liberal Party
 Belgium: DéFI, Party for Freedom and Progress, Vivant
 Bosnia and Herzegovina: Our Party
 Brazil : Workers' Party, Social Democratic Party, Brazilian Social Democracy Party
 Canada: Liberal Party of Canada
 Chile: Radical Party of Chile, Liberal Party of Chile
 Croatia: Croatian People's Party – Liberal Democrats, Centre, Civic Liberal Alliance, Istrian Democratic Assembly
 Czech Republic: Czech Pirate Party
 Denmark: Danish Social Liberal Party
 Egypt: Constitution Party
 Estonia: Estonian Centre Party, Estonian Greens, Estonia 200
 Faroe Islands: Self-Government Party
 Finland: Centre Party, Green League, National Coalition Party, Swedish People's Party of Finland
 France: La République En Marche!, Radical Party of the Left, Territories of Progress, The New Democrats
 Germany: Alliance 90/The Greens, Liberal Democrats, Social Democratic Party of Germany  (factions)
 Greenland: Democrats
 Hungary: Democratic Coalition
 Iceland: Bright Future
 India: Indian National Congress
 Indonesia: Indonesian Democratic Party of Struggle
 Israel: Israel Resilience Party, Yesh Atid
 Italy: Democratic Party  (factions), Italia Viva, Italian Republican Party, Action
 Japan: Constitutional Democratic Party of Japan
 Kosovo: Democratic Party of Kosovo
 Latvia: Development/For!
 Luxembourg: Democratic Party
 Malaysia: Democratic Action Party, People's Justice Party
 Montenegro: Positive Montenegro, United Reform Action
 Morocco: Citizens' Forces
 Myanmar: National League for Democracy, National Democratic Force
 Netherlands: Democrats 66
 New Zealand: New Zealand Labour Party  (factions)
 Norway: Liberal Party
 Philippines: Liberal Party
 Poland: Union of European Democrats
 Portugal: Together for the People
 Romania: PRO Romania
 Russia: Yabloko
 Serbia: Democratic Party
 Slovakia: Progressive Slovakia
 Slovenia: List of Marjan Šarec, Party of Alenka Bratušek
 South Africa: Democratic Alliance
 South Korea: Democratic Party of Korea, Justice Party
 Sweden: Liberals  (factions), Centre Party
 Taiwan: Democratic Progressive Party
 Turkey: Good Party Democracy and Progress Party
 Trinidad and Tobago: People's National Movement
 United Kingdom: Liberal Democrats, Liberal Party
 United States: Democratic Party

Historical social liberal parties or parties with social liberal factions 

 Andorra: Democratic Renewal
 Australia: Australian Democrats
 Belgium: Spirit 
 France: Radical Movement
 Germany: Free-minded People's Party, German Democratic Party, German People's Party, Progressive People's Party
 Greece: The River
 Hungary: Alliance of Free Democrats
 Iceland: Liberal Party, Union of Liberals and Leftists
 Israel: Independent Liberals, Kulanu, Progressive Party
 Italy: Action Party, Radical Party, Italian Liberal Party, Democratic Alliance, Democratic Union, The Democrats
 Japan: Democratic Party of Japan
 Latvia: Society for Political Change
 Lithuania: New Union (Social Liberals)
 Luxembourg: Radical Socialist Party
 Malta: Democratic Party
 Moldova: Our Moldova Alliance
 Netherlands: Free-thinking Democratic League
 Poland: Democratic Party – demokraci.pl, Spring,
 Russian: Constitutional Democratic Party
 Slovenia: Liberal Democracy of Slovenia, Zares
 South Korea: Progressive Party (1956), Uri Party, Grand Unified Democratic New Party
 Spain: Union, Progress and Democracy
 Switzerland: Ring of Independents
 United Kingdom: Liberal Party, Social Democratic Party

Notable thinkers 
Some notable scholars and politicians ordered by date of birth who are generally considered as having made significant contributions to the evolution of social liberalism as a political ideology include:

 Jeremy Bentham (1748–1832)
 John Stuart Mill(1806–1873)
 Thomas Hill Green (1836–1882)
 Lester Frank Ward (1841–1913)
 Lujo Brentano (1844–1931)
 Bernard Bosanquet (1848–1923)
 Woodrow Wilson (1856–1924)
 Émile Durkheim(1858–1917)
 John Atkinson Hobson (1858–1940)
 John Dewey (1859–1952)
 Friedrich Naumann(1860–1919)
 Gerhart von Schulze-Gävernitz(1864–1943)
 Leonard Trelawny Hobhouse(1864–1929)
 Tokuzō Fukuda (1874–1930)
 William Beveridge (1879–1963)
 Hans Kelsen (1881–1973)
 Mohammad Mossadegh (1882–1967)
 John Maynard Keynes(1883–1946)
 Franklin D. Roosevelt (1882–1945)
 Lester B. Pearson (1897–1972)
 Pierre Elliot Trudeau (1919–2000)
 Bertil Ohlin (1899–1979)
 Piero Gobetti (1901–1926)
 Karl Popper (1902–1994)
  (1904–1986)
 Isaiah Berlin (1909–1997)
 Norberto Bobbio (1909–2004)
 Masao Maruyama (1914–1996)
 John Rawls (1921–2002)
 Don Chipp (1925–2006)
 Karl-Hermann Flach (1929–1973)
 Vlado Gotovac (1930–2000)
 Richard Rorty (1931–2007)
 Ronald Dworkin(1931–2013)
 Amartya Sen (born 1933)
 José G. Merquior (1941–1991)
 Bruce Ackerman (born 1943)
 Roh Moo-hyun (1946–2009)
 Martha Nussbaum (born 1947)
 Grigory Yavlinsky (born 1952)
 Paul Krugman (born 1953)
 Dirk Verhofstadt (born 1955)
 Justin Trudeau (born 1971)
 Robert Biedroń (born 1976)

See also 

 Classical liberalism
 Classical radicalism
 Constitutional liberalism
 Left-libertarianism
 Liberalism by country
 Modern liberalism in the United States
 Neo-libertarianism
 Progressivism
 Social democracy
 Social-liberal coalition
 Social market economy

Notes

References

Sources

 Adams, Ian (2001). Political ideology today. Manchester: Manchester University Press, 2001. .
 De Ruggiero, Guido (1959). The History of European Liberalism. Boston: Beacon Press. 
 Faulks,  Keith (1999). Political Sociology: A Critical Introduction. Edinburgh: Edinburgh University Press. .
 Feuchtwanger, E. J. (1985). Democracy and Empire: Britain 1865-1914. London: Edward Arnold Publishers Ltd. .
 Richardson,  James L. (2001). Contending Liberalisms in World Politics. London: Lynne Rienner Publishers, Inc. .
 Slomp, Hans (2000). European Politics Into the Twenty-first Century: Integration and Division. Westport: Praeger Publishers. .

Further reading

External links 

 
 

 
Centre-left ideologies
Centrism
Liberalism
Political culture
Political ideologies
Social policy
Social philosophy

el:Φιλελευθερισμός#Κοινωνικός φιλελευθερισμός ή σοσιαλφιλελευθερισμός